James F. Masterson (March 25, 1926—April 12, 2010) was a prominent American psychiatrist.

He was an internationally recognized psychiatrist who helped inaugurate the study and treatment of personality disorder including borderline personality disorder and narcissistic personality disorder. He died April 12, 2010 of pneumonia at the age of eighty-four.

Life
Masterson was born March 25, 1926, in Elkins Park, Pennsylvania. His undergraduate studies at the University of Notre Dame were interrupted by Army service in World War II. After the war, he earned a medical degree from Jefferson Medical College in Philadelphia. He was long associated with the Payne Whitney Psychiatric Clinic in New York, serving as the head of its adolescent program in the 1960s and 1970s, where he developed his theory of borderline personality disorder.

A psychiatrist and psychoanalyst, Masterson was a founding authority on the theory and treatment of borderline and narcissistic personality disorders, as well as the understanding of personality disorder in general. At his death, he was clinical professor emeritus of psychiatry at Weill Medical College of Cornell University.

He was also the founder and director of the Masterson Group (for clinical treatment of personality disorder), as well as the Masterson Institute for Psychoanalytic Psychotherapy (later renamed the International Masterson Institute). Established in 1977, the I.M.I. still offers psychotherapeutic training at its headquarters in Manhattan and on the West Coast in San Francisco, as well as training and treatment at its branches in Vancouver, Istanbul, South Africa and Australia.

Masterson was among the first to bring the psychoanalytic approach known as object relations theory, together with child development theory, to bear on the study of personality disorder. In so doing, he helped widen the lens through which disturbance in mental health is viewed, seeing beyond the classical Freudian approach, which is limited to neurotic symptomatology. In work he began in the mid-20th century, Masterson came to believe that the origin and treatment of personality disorders starts with understanding the formation of self and relationship that begins in the first three years of life—the so-called preOedipal period.  During this time, the mother's loving support of the child's emerging self is critical for healthy psychic maturation. The psychoanalysts Otto F. Kernberg, Ronald Fairbairn, D.W. Winnicott and Heinz Kohut also played seminal roles in developing the concept of personality disorder.

In line with stressing the importance of maternal availability, Masterson argued that the personality disorders crucially involve the conflict between a person's two "selves": the false self, which the very young child constructs to please the mother, and the real self. The psychotherapy of personality disorders is an attempt to put people back in touch with their real selves.

Masterson, whose work also encompassed self theory as well as the neurobiology of personality disorders, was the author of many books. Among them are The Personality Disorders Through The Lens of Attachment Theory and the Neurobiologic Development of the Self (Zeig, Tucker & Theisen 2005), a clinical approach; The Search for the Real Self: Unmasking the Personality Disorders of Our Age (Free Press, Simon & Schuster 1988), written for a general readership; The Narcissistic and Borderline Disorders (Bruner/Mazel 1981); and The Psychiatric Dilemma of Adolescence (Little, Brown, 1967).

A distinguished life fellow of the American Psychiatric Association, he was also a fellow of the American College of Psychoanalysts, a founder of the American Society of Adolescent Psychiatry and a past president of the society's New York chapter.

Borderline personality disorder
Masterson founded his psychotherapeutic approach while facing the challenge of finding an effective way of working with an inpatient unit of acting-out adolescents.  This was in the 1960s, when such patients were supposed to "grow out of it".  Masterson, seeing that time alone was insufficient, devised a therapeutic approach for these "borderline" youngsters that was effective.  Masterson theorized that the dynamic structure of the borderline reflected a developmental arrest in the stage of childhood development described by Margaret Mahler as the "rapprochement" sub-phase: a time when the two-year-old is caught between unresolved urges toward dependence and independence.  Soon after, Masterson extended his work from adolescents to adults. (The term "borderline," when used by Masterson [and similarly by Kernberg] refers to a subtype of personality disorder, and is not a synonym for personality disorder, as it was originally introduced.)

On narcissism
In 1993, Masterson proposed two categories for pathological narcissism, "exhibitionist" and "closet". Those with both styles of disorder fail to adequately develop an age- and phase- appropriate self because of defects in the quality of psychological nurturing provided by the caregiver(s). The exhibitionist narcissist is similar to that described in DSM-IV and differs from the closet narcissist in several important ways.

The closet narcissist is more likely to be described as having a deflated, inadequate self perception and greater awareness of emptiness within, and seeks to mend this with an unquestioning dedication to an idealized other. The exhibitionist narcissist would be described as having an inflated, grandiose self perception with little or no conscious awareness of the emptiness within. Such a person would assume that this condition was normal but seeks the admiration of others for reassurance.

There is an analogy here with Kohut's "idealizing" and "mirror" narcissists (Masterson's "closet" and "exhibitionistic" narcissists), and a relationship to the developmental theory of Daniel Stern.

Schizoid personality disorder and developmental trauma
Masterson welcomed the ideas of those trained by him who had joined him in practicing and teaching the Masterson Approach. Specifically, in 1995, psychotherapeutic work with the schizoid personality disorder was introduced by Ralph Klein, M.D., Clinical Director of the Masterson Institute.  Also in 1995, the issue of trauma in personality disorder—including formulation of the concept of "developmental trauma" (how traumatic events within the first three years of life may affect the formation of personality) -- was introduced by Candace Orcutt, Ph.D., Associate.  In that year, writings on these and other topics expanding the Masterson Approach appeared in "Disorders of the Self: New Therapeutic Horizons" (Brunner/Mazel, NY, 1995).

Works  
 Psychotherapy of the Borderline Adult: A Developmental Approach. (Brunner/Mazel, 1976) 
 The Real Self: A Developmental, Self, and Object Relations Approach. (Brunner/Mazel, 1985) 
 The Search for the Real Self: Unmasking the Personality Disorders of Our Age. (Collier Macmillan, 1988) 
 The Emerging Self: A Developmental Self & Object Relations Approach to the Treatment of the Closet Narcissistic Disorder of the Self (Routledge, 1993)
 The Personality Disorders Through The Lens of Attachment Theory and the Neurobiologic Development of the Self (Zeig, Tucker & Theisen, 2005)
 The Search for the Real Self: Unmasking the Personality Disorders of Our Age (Free Press, Simon & Schuster, 1988)
 The Narcissistic and Borderline Disorders (Brunner/Mazel, 1981) 
 The Psychiatric Dilemma of Adolescence (Little, Brown, 1967)
 Disorders of the Self: New Therapeutic Horizons: The Masterson Approach, Masterson & Klein, eds.  (Brunner/Mazel, 1995).

References

External links
  New Focus on Narcissism offers Analysts insight into Grandiosity and Emptiness

1926 births
2010 deaths
20th-century American psychologists
American psychoanalysts
Narcissism writers
University of Notre Dame alumni
Thomas Jefferson University alumni
Writers from Philadelphia
Deaths from pneumonia in Connecticut